The Very Best Of The Manhattan Transfer is a compilation album of The Manhattan Transfer released in 1994 on the Atlantic Records label.

This album is a selection of the core songs of the group, spanning more than twenty years.

Track listing
"Boy From New York City" (George Davis, John T. Taylor John Taylor) (3:40)
"Trickle Trickle" (Clarence Bassett) (2:20)
"Gloria" (Esther Navarro) (2:58)
"Operator" (William Spivery) (3:11)
"Tuxedo Junction" (Erskine Hawkins, William Johnson, Julian Dash, Buddy Feyne) (3:04)
"Four Brothers" (Jimmy Giuffre, Jon Hendricks) (3:48)
"Ray's Rockhouse" (Ray Charles, Jon Hendricks) (5:08)
"Soul Food to Go (Sina)" (Djavan, Doug Fieger) (5:15)
"Spice of Life" (Derek Bramble, Rod Temperton) (3:41)
"Baby Come Back to Me (The Morse Code of Love)" (Nick Santamaria) (2:54)
"Candy" (Mack David, Alex Kramer, Joan Whitney Kramer) (3:28)
"A Nightingale Sang In Berkeley Square" (Manning Sherwin, Eric Maschwitz) (3:50)
"Birdland" (Joe Zawinul, Jon Hendricks) (6:01)
"Java Jive" (Milton Drake, Ben Oakland)(2:46)
"Route 66" (Bobby Troup) (2:55)
"Twilight Zone/Twilight Tone" (Jay Graydon, Bernard Herrmann, Alan Paul) (6:06)

Album Cover

The original cover of this album featured a band photo featuring Laurel Massé. Though it was almost immediately pulled from store shelves, and replaced with the more familiar photo including Cheryl Bentyne, a limited amount made it into circulation.

References / Sources
The Manhattan Transfer Official Website

The Manhattan Transfer albums
1994 greatest hits albums
Atlantic Records compilation albums